Treppengraben is a small river of Bavaria, Germany. It is a left tributary of the Bruchbach near Kleinostheim.

See also
List of rivers of Bavaria

Rivers of Bavaria
Rivers of Germany

de:Bruchbach (Haggraben)#Quellbäche